The Women's Downhill LW2 was one of the events held in Alpine skiing at the 1988 Winter Paralympics in Innsbruck.

There were 12 competitors in the final.

The United States' Diana Golden set a time of 1:23.90, taking the gold medal.

Results

Final

References 

Downhill
Para